NF-kappa-B inhibitor beta is a protein that in humans is encoded by the NFKBIB gene.

Function 

NFKB1 (MIM 164011) or NFKB2 (MIM 164012) is bound to REL (MIM 164910), RELA (MIM 164014), or RELB (MIM 604758) to form the NFKB complex. The NFKB complex is inhibited by I-kappa-B proteins (NFKBIA, MIM 164008, or NFKBIB), which inactivate NF-kappa-B by trapping it in the cytoplasm. Phosphorylation of serine residues on the I-kappa-B proteins by kinases (IKBKA, MIM 600664 or IKBKB, MIM 603258) marks them for destruction via the ubiquitination pathway, thereby allowing activation of the NF-kappa-B complex. Activated NFKB complex translocates into the nucleus and binds DNA at kappa-B-binding motifs such as 5-prime GGGRNNYYCC 3-prime or 5-prime HGGARNYYCC 3-prime (where H is A, C, or T; R is an A or G purine; and Y is a C or T pyrimidine).[supplied by OMIM]

Interactions 

NFKBIB has been shown to interact with:
 IKK2,
 RELA,  and
 Retinoid X receptor alpha.

References

Further reading